Firuzi (also Romanized as Fīrūzī; also known as Firuzi Korbal and Fīrūzī-ye Korbāl) is a village in Band-e Amir Rural District, Zarqan District, Shiraz County, Fars Province, Iran. At the 2006 census, its population was 112, in 32 families.

References 

Populated places in Zarqan County